The Swearengens are an American alternative country band formed in 2010 in Seattle.

Background
The band consists of Fredd Luongo on vocals and guitar, Soren Godbersen on guitars and "Cadillacs, etc.", Forrest Marowitz on bass and backing vocals, and Jesse Harmonson on drums. All of their songs are written by frontman Fredd. They can often be found playing, and sipping a beverage, at places in Seattle like the Tractor Tavern, the Conor Byrne Pub and the Little Red Hen.

The band has been described as: "From epic road songs to tear-stained tales of heartache, from Texas-style rockers to dark-humored murder ballads, The Swearengens cover a lot of musical and emotional territory in their twisted attempt at reviving the glory days alt-country of Whiskeytown, The Jayhawks, Dwight Yoakam, Uncle Tupelo, and Steve Earle."

The band released their first album, Devil Gets Her Way, on June 30, 2012. It was named one of "Seattle's Best Country Albums of 2012" by Seattle Weekly. Their second album, Waiting On The Sunrise, was released on June 8, 2013. It was named one of the "Top Ten Albums of 2013" by Leigh Bezezekoff at KEXP-FM. The band's most recent album, 'Merican Woman & Other Tales, was released on June 26, 2015.

Discography

References

External links
 The Swearengens on Bandcamp
 
 The Swearengens on YouTube

American country music groups
American alternative country groups
American country rock groups
Musical groups established in 2010
Musical groups from Seattle
2010 establishments in Washington (state)